Sneaky Sound System is the self-titled debut album by Australian music collective, Sneaky Sound System, released on 12 August 2006. It peaked at No. 5 on the ARIA Albums Chart and remained in the top 50 for 61 weeks. The album was certified 3× platinum in 2011 for shipment of 210,000 copies. Six singles were released from the album, with four of them reaching the ARIA Singles Chart top 50: "I Love It" (July 2006), "Pictures" (December), "UFO" (April 2007) and "Goodbye" (October). At the ARIA Music Awards of 2007 they won ARIA Award for Best Dance Release and ARIA Award for Breakthrough Artist – Album for Sneaky Sound System.

Information
Sneaky Sound System was released on 12 August 2006 by Australian electropop and dance music collective, Sneaky Sound System. It entered the ARIA Albums Chart at position 44 on 7 January 2007. It provided six singles with four of them reaching the top 50 on the associated singles chart: "I Love It" (July 2006), "Pictures" (December), "UFO" (April 2007) and "Goodbye" (October). "Pictures" peaked at number one on the ARIA Club Chart with its Tonite Only remix. "UFO" was their highest-charting single on the regular ARIA Singles Chart, which reached No. 11. "I Love It", which reached No. 24, remained in the top 100 for 73 weeks – the longest chart run by an Australian artist.

When the nominees for the 2007 ARIA Awards were announced Sneaky Sound System received five nominations for the album including; Best Dance Release, Best Independent Release, Breakthrough Artist – Album, Best Group and Album of the Year. At the awards ceremony, in October, they won Best Dance Release and Breakthrough Artist – Album. In the following week, the album reached its peaked position of number five on the ARIA Albums Chart and remained in the top 50 for a total of 61 weeks. The album was accredited 2× platinum by ARIA at the end of that year. In 2011 it was certified 3× platinum for shipment of 210,000 copies.

A UK compilation album was released on 20 April 2009 featuring three tracks from Sneaky Sound System and nine from their second studio album 2.

Track listing

Personnel 
 Black Angus (a.k.a. Angus McDonald) – all instruments, guitars (track 7, disc 2), producer, producer (track 7, disc 2)
 Nick Broadhurst – MIDI sax (track 4)
 Alex Caradetis – drum solo (track 2)
 Miss Connie – vocals (track 7, disc 2)
 Peter Dolso – all instruments, cover art (collector's edition), engineered, mixed by, producer
 Stylaz Fuego – additional producer (track 2, disc 2), remixer (track 2, disc 2)
 Dave Glass – cover art (also on collector's edition)
 Jack Glass – additional producer (track 6, disc 2), remixer (track 6, disc 2)
 Goodwill – additional producer (track 4, disc 2), remixer (track 4, disc 2)
 Groove Terminator – additional producer (track 1, disc 2), remixer (track 1, disc 2)
 Mike Marsh – mastering
 Michael Morgan – engineer (track 7, disc 2)
 Jonny Powell – additional producer (track 5, disc 2), remixer (track 5, disc 2)
 Riot in Belgium – additional producer (track 3, disc 2), remixer (track 3, disc 2)
 Sam LA More – additional producer (track 1, disc 2), engineer (track 1, disc 2), remixer (track 1, disc 2)
 Bennie Single – cover art (also on collector's edition)
 Sloan – bass (track 7, disc 2), keys (track 7, disc 2)
 Chris Stracey – additional producer (track, disc 2), remixer (track 6, disc 2)
 John-Paul Talbot – additional producer (track 5, disc 2), remixer (track 5, disc 2)
 Van She Tech – additional producer (track 3, disc 2), remixer (track 3, disc 2)
 Rob Woolf – piano solo (track 2)

Charts

Weekly charts

Year-end charts

Certifications

Release history

References 

2006 debut albums
Sneaky Sound System albums
Whack Records albums
ARIA Award-winning albums